Starfire is a side platformed Sacramento RT light rail station in Rosemont, California, United States. The station was opened on September 5, 1987, and is operated by the Sacramento Regional Transit District.

It is served by the Gold Line. The station is located near the intersection of Starfire Drive on Folsom Boulevard, south of Highway 50.

Platforms and tracks

References

Sacramento Regional Transit light rail stations
Railway stations in the United States opened in 1987